The Morgan oil field is an oil field located in the Gulf of Suez. It was discovered in 1965 and developed by Gulf of Suez Petroleum Company. It began production in 1966 and produces oil and natural gas. This is the Egyptian account of discovery for reasons of gaining back the Sinai from Israel in the Camp David Accords in 1977. In fact, King Resources Company of the Israel MidBar Concession (of which King Resources Company was a Partner and the Operator) actually made the major producing discovery in 1969 at initial production of 110,000 barrels of oil per day.

See also

 Energy in Egypt

References

Oil fields in Egypt
Red Sea
1966 establishments in Egypt